Sihina Wasanthayak (Summer of Dreams) was a popular Sri Lankan television series directed by Sunil Costha and Saranga Mendis. A romantic drama, it was an adaption from the 2004 Tamil language film  Autograph and was telecast on Sirasa TV in 2008-2009. The songs and soundtrack for the series were composed by Dinesh Subasinghe.

Production 
The series was produced by Harold Wijesinghe, Broadcast Solutions, and Sirasa TV in 2007. It consisted of 62 episodes in all, each 20 minutes long.  The filming began in June 2007 at Dambulla and Sigiriya and later shifted to Colombo.

Plot 
This serial begins with the character Nirmal (played by Niroshan Wijesinghe) setting off on a journey, distributing wedding invitations for his forthcoming wedding. Along the way, he encounters various individuals from his past, who bring back memories of three women that have affected his love life.

The journey to his childhood days begins there. The happenings in the school, his tussle with his friends and his first love with his classmate, Sunimali (played by Pamudi Karunaratne (In childhood) and Kanchana Mendis) are all pictured realistically. Nirmal reaches the village and invites all, including Sunimale, who promises to come to the wedding with her husband and three children. Then, he goes to North where he had his college education. His major crush at that time was a girl of mixed Tamil and Malayalee parentage (played by Warsha Perera), with whom he fell in love. The affair proved to be short-lived as her parents married her off to her cousin. On reaching Kerala to invite her, Nirmal is shattered to see his lover as a widow.

Then he comes across a trusted friend Pooja (played by Sachini Ayendra Stanley), who instils confidence and teaches him the lesson that one has to go ahead in life without looking back. However, she does not reveal the tragedy that occurred in her past. But as time passes by, she reveals that her mother is paralyzed and that she now has to work for her own survival.

Cast 
Niroshan Wijesinghe as Nirmal
 Isham Samzudeen as Young Nirmal
Kanchana Mendis as Sunimali
 Pramudi Karunarathna as Young Sunimali
Cletus Mendis
Kumara Thirimadura 
Sachini Ayendra Stanley as Pooja
Nimal Pallewatha
Warsha Perera as Tamil girl
Devnaka Porage

Music 
The show's theme song, "Sansara purudada mey", was performed by Amal Perera, Prabodha Kariyakarawana and Dinesh Subasinghe. The children's voices were sung by Thayalan and Madawa Senivrathana. Cover versions of the song have been performed on the Derana TV program Dream Stars by Chinthaka Malith and Dinesh Tharanga, and on the Sirasa TV program Superstar by Meena Prasadhini and Wirajika Murashini. The sound track and songs were recorded and mixed at G 1 Studio, Dee R Cee Studio and Penguin Studio in Colombo and were released on CD in 2009 by Dinesh Subasinghe with M entertainment.

Notes

External links 
Sihina Wasanthayak on IMDb

Sri Lankan drama television series
2000s Sri Lankan television series
Sirasa TV original programming